Latakia is a city in Syria.
Latakia also may refer to:
 Latakia (tobacco), originally produced in Syria
 Battles fought near the city:
 Battle of Latakia, a naval battle of the Yom Kippur War
 Second Battle of Latakia
 Zones in or near the city:
 Latakia Camp, a Palestinian refugee camp
 Latakia Sports City,  a sport complex in Latakia, Syria
 Other governmental divisions named for the city:
 Modern:
 Latakia District, a Syrian district (mantiqah) administratively belonging to Latakia Governorate
 Latakia Governorate, a governorate in Syria
 Ancient Roman Laodicea in Syria, AKA Laodicea ad mare